Prvan Selo is a village in Perušić, Croatia.

Populated places in Lika-Senj County